Billy Cole (born 10 February 1965) is a male British former track and field athlete who specialised in the shot put. His sole major achievement was a gold medal at the 1986 Commonwealth Games. He also won three UK Championships and four AAA titles (two outdoor, two indoor)

Career
Cole began competing in the shot put at an early age and took part in international competition, winning the 1981 title for England at the British International Schools Match and a bronze at the 1982 Gymnasiade behind compatriot Chris Ellis. Nationally, he rose through the ranks at the English Schools Championships, winning the under-15s title in 1979 and then the under-20 title in 1982. As a member of the Newham and Essex Beagles athletics club, he took part in the junior AAA championships.

He began to make his impact at the senior level in 1983, starting at the national level. He third at the AAA Indoor Championships then was runner-up at the UK Athletics Championships that year behind Nick Tabor. The year after he rose to second at the AAA Indoors (behind Mike Winch) and won his first national title at the UK Championships.

The 1986 season was the peak of Cole's career. These marks were his best performances ever at those competitions. His personal best moved him up to fifth on the all-time United Kingdom lists behind Geoff Capes, Mike Winch, Arthur Rowe and Bill Tancred. His achievements that year brought him his first and only senior selection for England at the 1986 Commonwealth Games held in Edinburgh. The standard of throwing at that tournament was much lower than it had been in the preceding years, and Cole won the gold medal with a throw of  – the shortest winning throw for 24 years.

Despite his Commonwealth title coming at such an early stage of his career, he did not compete at a high level of the sport after that.

International competitions

References

Living people
1965 births
British male shot putters
English male shot putters
Commonwealth Games gold medallists for England
Commonwealth Games medallists in athletics
Athletes (track and field) at the 1986 Commonwealth Games
Medallists at the 1986 Commonwealth Games